Prince Kwame Amoabeng, known by his stage name Jeneral Ntatia (born April 12, 1986) is a Ghanaian  comedian and actor.

Early life and education 
Jeneral Ntatia was born in Accra but a native of Fomena, Adansi North in the Ashanti Region of Ghana. He had his Primary Education at Adedenkpo 1 Primary School and his Junior High education at Accra Royal School. He then proceeded to Accra Secondary Technical School. Ntatia got admission at the School of Performing Arts of the University of Ghana, where he studied Theatre Arts.

Comedy career and acting 
He began his comedy career in 2008 after completing Secondary School, he took a major interest in comedy when he gained admission at University of Ghana School of Performing Arts.  
As an actor, Jeneral Ntatia has featured in several Ghanaian movies including "Keteke", "Kalybos In China", "Mad House", and "Chaskele".

Filmography

Television Series
 MTN Yello Cafe 
 Styke 
 To have and to Hold 
 The Osei's

Theatre
 Second Coming of Nkrumah 
 The Leopards Choice 
 Adam in Court 
 Red Light 
 Man in the Dark 
 The Trial 
 Accra We Dey 
 The Ladder 
 Flows for Sale 
 Chronicles of the Sagacious 
 Christmas in April 
 Bukom 
 The Inspection

Awards and nominations

References

External links
 

Living people
Ghanaian actors
Ghanaian comedians
1986 births
Ghanaian male film actors
20th-century Ghanaian male actors